This is a list of VTV dramas released in 1995.

←1994 - 1995 - 1996→

VTV Tet dramas
These films were released on VTV channel during Tet holiday. In this time, all of the channels were merged with a single broadcast schedule. The playbacks of movies or dramas were not included.

Vietnamese dramas on VTV1 night time slot
VTV1 night time slot during this time comprises the time slot for new dramas on Wednesday-Friday-Sunday nights and the time slot for Vietnamese feature films playback on Saturday night. The list below includes all of Vietnamese films and dramas aired in Wed-Fri-Sun time slot. Several films was aired on Monday, Tuesday or Thursday in special occasions.

VTV1 Sunday Literature & Art dramas
These dramas air in Sunday afternoon on VTV1 as a part of the program Sunday Literature & Art (Vietnamese: Văn nghệ Chủ Nhật).

Note: The issue on 19 Feb was released without the drama.

See also
 List of dramas broadcast by Vietnam Television (VTV)
 List of dramas broadcast by Hanoi Radio Television (HanoiTV)
 List of dramas broadcast by Vietnam Digital Television (VTC)

References

External links
VTV.gov.vn – Official VTV Website 
VTV.vn – Official VTV Online Newspaper 

Vietnam Television original programming
1995 in Vietnamese television